José Guillermo García (born 25 June 1933) is a former general of the military of El Salvador and was minister of defense of the Revolutionary Government Junta of El Salvador between the years 1979 and 1983.

Emigration to United States 

He emigrated to the United States in 1989, were lived until January 2016 when was deported to El Salvador.

Lawsuit cases
He was sued, along with Carlos Eugenio Vides Casanova, in the United States district court in West Palm Beach in two precedent-setting legal actions:
 Ford v. Garcia, a lawsuit by the families of four Catholic churchwomen, including two Maryknoll Sisters of St. Dominic, who were murdered by a Salvadoran military death squad on 2 December 1980.  Garcia's defense won the case, and the families appealed.  Their appeal was denied, and in 2003, the United States Supreme Court refused to hear further proceedings.
 Ramagoza v. Garcia, a lawsuit filed by the Center for Justice and Accountability on behalf of survivors of torture during the Salvadoran Civil War.  Garcia lost, and a judgment of over $54 million (U.S.) was entered against him and his co-defendant, and upheld on appeal.

Deportation to El Salvador 

Guillermo Garcia and General Vides Casanova had been undergoing a deportation process since 1999. The Department of Homeland Security later charged Garcia in 2009 with participating or assisting in torture and extrajudicial killings during his tenure as Minister of Defense. His attorney Alina Cruz argued that he could not be deported on those grounds because he was already exonerated of those charges in the landmark case Ford vs. Garcia when a jury found that he was not in control of his troops. It was determined in 1998 that Garcia's co-defendant General Vides Casanova and Casanova's cousin Col. Oscar Edgardo Casanova Vejar, the local military commander in Zacatecoluca, had planned and orchestrated the executions of the four North American churchwomen.

On 12 April 2014, an immigration court judge ruled against Garcia and called for his deportation.  On 16 December 2015, it was announced that an immigration appeals court upheld the decision to deport Garcia. Garcia's attorney afterwards said they both plan to appeal the decision to the Eleventh Circuit Court of Appeals in Atlanta, Georgia.

On 8 January 2016, American immigration officials deported General Garcia back to El Salvador.

See also
 Juan Romagoza Arce
 Carlos Eugenio Vides Casanova
 Western Hemisphere Institute for Security Cooperation
 Maura Clarke
 Jean Donovan
 Ita Ford
 Dorothy Kazel
 Salvadoran Civil War

References

1933 births
Living people
People from San Vicente, El Salvador
Defence ministers of El Salvador
Salvadoran military personnel
People of the Salvadoran Civil War
1980 murders of U.S. missionaries in El Salvador